Chloe Watson (born 1997) is an Irish international lawn and Indoor bowler.

Bowls career
Beginning her career within the sport of Bowls in 2008, Watson gained her first International cap at the age of 10 representing Ireland in Cardiff, Wales. Since then, Chloe has played 195+ games representing Ireland and has been named The Belfast Telegraphs Sports Person of the Year.

Indoor
Watson has won over 30 Irish national indoor titles and to date is the only Irish Lady in history to hold all 5 titles in 1 year (2016), U25 Singles, Ladies Singles, Ladies Pairs, Ladies Triples & Ladies Fours; the singles, triples and fours in 2015, 2016 and 2017 and the pairs in 2016. She is also a winner of the World IIBC Under-25 Women's singles title  and won the 2017 World IIBC Senior Championship in Swansea to seal her place in the 2018 World Indoor Bowls Championship (Potters) which she also went on to win at Under 25 level.

Outdoor
She won the 2016 triples title at the Irish National Bowls Championships bowling for the Northern Ireland Civil Service (NICS) Bowls Club & U25 Pairs as well as being a several times U25 singles winner

References

1997 births
Living people
Female lawn bowls players from Northern Ireland